This article describes the book by Lion Feuchtwanger. For the play by Franz Grillparzer, see The Jewess of Toledo.

Die Jüdin von Toledo is a 1955 novel by German-Jewish writer Lion Feuchtwanger.  The story focuses on the "Golden Age" of learning in medieval Spain.  The novel also describes the affair of Alfonso VIII with the Jewish Raquel in Toledo.  In Lion Feuchtwanger's prologue to the story, he mentions that the ballad was originally written by Alfonso X of Castile in regards to his Great-Grandfather (Alfonso VIII).

1955 German novels
Jews and Judaism in Toledo, Spain
German historical novels
Novels set in Spain
Toledo, Spain in fiction